Vajiko Chachkhiani is a Georgian artist whose work mostly involves film, sculpture, photography and visual installations. Currently he lives and works in Berlin, Germany and Tbilisi, Georgia. Chachkhiani's work has been shown at the Venice Biennale.

Early life 
Vajiko Chachkhiani was born in Tbilisi, Georgia. He studied Mathematics and Informatics at the Georgian Technical University, Tbilisi, before turning to Fine Arts, which he studied at Universität der Künste, Berlin, Germany and Gerrit Rietveld Academie in Amsterdam, Netherlands.

Career 
At the Venice Biennale in 2017, he showcased a Georgian log cabin, that he received from the mining town of Chiatura. The cabin was filled with typical furniture and ordinary objects. Eventually, the rain started getting inside the work, causing moss to grow and creating an inversion between inside and outside. The title "A Living Dog in the Midst of Dead Lions" probably relates to the exhibition's location in Venice, whose symbol is the lion.

At the Bonn Art and Exhibition Hall of the Federal Republic of Germany (also known as the Bundeskunsthalle) in 2018, Chachkhiani showed the disturbing story of a family in the short-film "Heavy Metal Honey". The film starts with a quiet family meeting and turns unreal when the mother starts shooting the family members. In the ending, everyone is sitting unharmed at the table.

Solo exhibitions 
 2014 – Both, Siegen, Germany
 2017 – Living Dog Among Dead Lions, Georgian Pavillon, 57th Venice Biennale, Venice, Italy
 2018 – Winter Which Was Not There, Turku Art Museum, Finland
 2018 – Heavy Metal Honey, Bundeskunsthalle, Bonn
 2018 – Flies bite, Its going to rain, Yarat Contemporary Art Space, Baku, Azerbaijan
 2019 – Film, Berlinische Galerie, Berlin, Germany
 2022 - The New Year, [[Pori Art Museum], Finland

Collections 
 , Clermont-Ferrand, France
 Han Nefkens Foundation, Barcelona, Spain
 , Siegen, Germany

Awards 
 2013 – DAAD-award, Bonn, Germany
 2014 – 7th Rubens Promotional Award, Museum für Gegenwartskunst, Siegen, Germany
 2015 – Arbeitsstipendium, Stiftung Kunstfonds, Bonn, Germany
 2017 – Future Generation Art Prize 2017, PinchukArtCentre, Kyiv, Ukraine
 2019 – One of 4 recipients of a Villa Aurora fellowship for visual arts, Los Angeles, USA

References

External links 
 http://www.danielmarzona.com/artists/vajiko-chachkhiani/

21st-century artists from Georgia (country)
People from Georgia (country)
Georgian emigrants to Germany
Living people
1985 births
Gerrit Rietveld Academie alumni